Lucy Siame (born 1985), known professionally as Lucy Love is a rapper, singer and artist from Copenhagen, Denmark.

Early life

Lucy Siame was born in 1985 in Zambia to a white British mother and Zambian father. They moved to Copenhagen when Lucy was two years old.

Career

Lucy Love has made two albums with her producer and band member Yo Akim (Joakim Hjejle), Superbillion and Kilo. Notable singles are "No V.I.P.", "Daddy Was A DJ", "Poison", "Who You Are" & "Thunder". She is also known for her visual liveshows.

In 2018, she participated in season 15 of Vild med dans, finishing in fourth place alongside professional dancer Michael Olesen.

Discography

 2009: Superbillion
 2010: Kilo
 2013: Desperate Days of Dynamite
 2020: Hammerhead

References

External links 
 Official Youtube channel

1985 births
Danish women rappers
Danish rappers
Grime music artists
Living people
Musicians from Copenhagen